Timothy Hall (February 15, 1974 – September 30, 1998) was an American football running back in the National Football League who played for the Oakland Raiders. He played college football at Kemper Military School and for the Robert Morris Colonials.

Career
In 1994, Hall rushed for 1,336 yards 11 touchdowns with an NCAA best 8.7 yards per carry. Hall also caught 26 passes for 460 yards and 3 touchdowns. In 1995, he rushed for 1,572 yards and 16 touchdowns and also caught 31 passes for 333 yards and 3 touchdowns.

Hall was selected in the 6th round of the NFL draft by the Oakland Raiders. He was the first player drafted from Robert Morris University and the first football player to have his jersey number (#45) retired at Robert Morris.

Hall spent two seasons with the Raiders before being cut in preseason of the 1998 season. After this he worked out for several teams and, according to his agent, was close to choosing his next team when he was killed.

Death
Hall was shot to death on September 30, 1998. Hall was in a car with a childhood friend, who was apparently targeted for an unknown reason.  the case is still unsolved. A tribute to Hall was held at Robert Morris University in the weeks after his murder.

References

1974 births
1998 deaths
American football running backs
Oakland Raiders players
Robert Morris Colonials football players
Deaths by firearm in Missouri
American murder victims
Male murder victims
People murdered in Missouri